Masahide (written: 正秀, 正英, 昌秀, 政秀, 政英 or 雅英) is a masculine Japanese given name. Notable people with the name include:

, Japanese samurai
, Japanese sprinter
, Japanese diplomat
, Japanese footballer
, Japanese baseball player
, Japanese poet and samurai
, Japanese academic and politician

Japanese masculine given names